Silvia de Luna (born 10 October 1957) is a Guatemalan former equestrian. She competed in the individual eventing at the 1976 Summer Olympics.

References

External links
 

1957 births
Living people
Guatemalan female equestrians
Guatemalan dressage riders
Olympic equestrians of Guatemala
Equestrians at the 1976 Summer Olympics
Equestrians at the 2007 Pan American Games
Competitors at the 1993 Central American and Caribbean Games
Competitors at the 2006 Central American and Caribbean Games
Competitors at the 2010 Central American and Caribbean Games
Competitors at the 2014 Central American and Caribbean Games
Place of birth missing (living people)
Pan American Games competitors for Guatemala